Hongqi is a Chinese luxury car marque owned by the automaker FAW Car Company, itself a subsidiary of FAW Group. Hongqi was launched in 1959, making it the oldest Chinese passenger car marque. In Chinese, hongqi means "red flag."

Originally, Hongqi models were only for high-ranking government officials. They ceased production in 1981 but were later revived in the mid-1990s.

History

Origins to 1991
While the name has endured, the vehicles that bear the brand have varied significantly. Originally a dignitary's car, the brand's later vehicles have ranged from serving as taxis to low-end business sedans; during the 60th anniversary of the People's Republic of China parade, the brand returned to its roots by carrying party leaders.

The original Hongqi cars were a luxury item used for the transport of foreign dignitaries and the party elite. Although Chairman Mao claimed not to have been driven in a Hongqi until Nixon's 1972 visit, he did take a personal interest in the cars from the beginning.

Introduced on August 1, 1958, the first Hongqi was the CA72. By September, a convertible version intended to be used by dignitaries in National Day parades had appeared. The CA72's design was based on a 1955 Chrysler. From the beginning, the full-size Hongqi was equipped with a  V8 engine. The grille was based on a traditional design of a Chinese fan and remains in use on Hongqis today.

First introduced in 1963, the CA770 model remained in production until 1980, albeit in limited numbers. Around 1,600 of these V8-engined Hongqis were built in total, and over the years various versions were released, including a 1965 long-wheelbase model with three rows of seats and a 1969 armored version (CA772).

1991 to 2015

Between 1995 and 2006, foreign products were manufactured in China and sold as Hongqi models. These included the Audi 100 (CA7200/CA7220) and the Lincoln Town Car (CA7460). There were two Audi 100-based versions—the more luxurious "Century Star" and the smaller (1.8-litre) Hongqi Mingshi.

FAW began production of the third generation of Hongqi vehicles in 2006. Named the HQ3 and based on the Toyota Crown Majesta, it saw little market success. First year sales totaled near 500, and while the target for the second year was 1,400 units, the HQ3 would not be profitable until annual sales of 5,000 were reached—something that may never have happened. By October 2008, the price was reduced considerably and the name changed to Shengshi ("Days of Prosperity") in order to better appeal to private buyers. Sales during the first half of 2008 were all from inventory and totaled 788.

Debuting by 2013, 30,000 units of the latest Hongqi model were initially expected to be produced, though a year after launch, less than 5,000 had been sold. Sales are through government procurement; the car is billed as "the official car for minister-level officials." In 2014, the People's Liberation Army purchased at least 1,000 H7 models. A much more expensive model, the L5, was also on sale alongside the H7.

2015 to present
From 2017 to 2021, the brand experienced extremely high growth, from 4702 units in 2017 to over 33,000 in 2018, over 100,000 in 2019, over 200,000 in 2020, and over 300,000 in 2021, a growth of 63 times in 4 years.

In 2023, the brand re-entered the minibus market for the first time since selling the Hongqi CA630 minibus in the 1980s, with the 23-seat Hongqi QM7.

Current products

Products not open to public sale

Former products

Concept cars

Hongqi will sometimes make an appearance at autoshows held on Chinese soil, showing off a concept car that attracts attention.

At the 2005 Shanghai International Auto Exhibition, a Hongqi HQD concept car was displayed.

A Hongqi SUV concept was unveiled at the 2008 Beijing International Automotive Exhibition.

At the 2015 Shanghai International Auto Exhibition, Hongqi displayed a concept SUV radically different from its 2008 entry.

At the 2018 Beijing International Auto Exhibition, Hongqi unveiled the electric sports car E-Jing GT Concept.

At the 2019 Frankfurt Motor Show, Hongqi unveiled the sports car S9 and the SUV E115.

At the 2021 Shanghai International Auto Exhibition, Hongqi unveiled the luxury limousine L-Concept.

HQE 
Not strictly a concept car, the V12-powered Hongqi HQE was used by high-ranking official Hu Jintao during parades celebrating the 60th anniversary of the People's Republic of China. It appeared on an official list of upcoming models in 2010 with a retail price of 1.2 million US dollars (which would have made it the most expensive Chinese-built car in history). This model has since been shown at the 2010 Beijing Auto Show as the CA7600L. It is equipped with a  6.0 L V12 engine developed in-house.

S9 
Similarly to the HQE, The Hongqi S9, is not strictly a concept car, it is set to start production in Italy with Silk-FAW, a joint venture between the FAW group and American based design firm Silk EV. the S9 is luxury sports car powered by a combustion 4.0 L twin-turbo V8 engine associated with a hybrid system, providing it with an output of 1,381 hp. The production version of the S9 was introduced in 2021 Auto Shanghai.

Relationship with Besturn
Hongqi and another FAW Group brand, Besturn, have exhibited some overlap. In 2008, due to flagging sales, Hongqi showrooms were merged with those of the new Besturn brand. It was thought that giving the Hongqi brand more sales outlets would increase turnover. At the 2010 Beijing Auto Show, Besturn models were shown "under the Hongqi naming series," and until 2011 the two brands both used the Hongqi "circled one" badging.

Sales

Domestic
A total of 2,534 Hongqi vehicles were sold in China in 2013, making it the 67th largest-selling car brand in the country in that year (and the 41st largest-selling Chinese brand). Hongqi sold 2,774 cars in 2014 and became the 72nd largest car brand in China.

Overseas
Hongqi has had a presence in Dubai since December 2018, with 20 vehicles of the H5 and H7 models sold for use in the 2019 NEXT summit.

On December 30, 2020, Hongqi exported 400 H9 and H5 sedans, HS7 and HS5 SUVs to Jeddah in Saudi Arabia.

In September 2021, Hongqi has launched in Norway.

On February 1, 2022, Hongqi launched in Vietnam with the E-HS9 and H9 being the first vehicle to be sold. Hongqi has a presence in Israel as of April 6, 2022 with the launch of the Hongqi E-HS9 under the Samelet Group.

In popular culture 
A 1978 Hongqi CA770 was featured in a 2017 episode of Jay Leno's Garage.

The Hongqi L5 was reviewed by Jeremy Clarkson in a 2019 film for The Grand Tour taking place in China. Armed with western luxury cars, Clarkson and the other presenters sought to prove that Anglo luxury cars are inferior through a series of performance challenges.

References

External links

Hongqi official site 
Hongqi overseas official site
Auto Gallery (pictures of various Hongqi models gasgoo.com

Hongqi